Tarentola senegambiae is a species of gecko found in northern Africa.

References

Tarentola
Reptiles described in 1984